The Women's time trial of the 2013 Dutch National Time Trial Championships (NK tijdrijden) cycling took place in and around Winsum, nearby the city Groningen, in the Netherlands on 19 June 2013. Winsum got the event due to the success of the 2012 Energiewacht Tour. The individual time trial at the 2013 Energiewacht Tour took place on the same course. Ellen van Dijk was the defending champion, who won the national title at the 2012 Dutch National Time Trial Championships.

Ellen van Dijk won the time trial in a time of 33’ 56", 39 seconds ahead of Loes Gunnewijk and 61 seconds of Annemiek van Vleuten.

Preview
Ellen van Dijk, the 2012 Dutch national champion, was the main favourite for the title. She was the best Duch rider in all the 2013 time trials (stage 3a 2013 Energiewacht Tour, 2013 EPZ Omloop van Borsele, prologue and stage 2 2013 Gracia–Orlová, GP Leende, 2013 Emakumeen Euskal Bira) and won them almost all. The best Dutch riders in the time trial at the 2013 Energiewacht Tour on the same course behind Van Dijk were Loes Gunnewijk and Kirsten Wild. One of the other favourites was Annemiek van Vleuten, the runner up of the 2012 edition.

Schedule
Wednesday 19 June
10:30 First block of 20 cyclists
11:30 Second block of 20 cyclists
12:45 Victory Ceremony

Source

Results

Final classification

Source

Starting order

See also

2013 Dutch National Road Race Championships – Women's road race
2013 national road cycling championships

References

External links

Dutch National Time Trial Championships
2013 in women's road cycling
Sports competitions in Groningen (province)
Sport in Het Hogeland